Tashir (Tashar) is a rural locality (an ulus) in Selenginsky District, Republic of Buryatia, Russia. The population was 1,206 as of 2010. There are 88 streets.

References 

Rural localities in Selenginsky District